A certain family of BCH codes have a particularly useful property, which is that
treated as linear operators, their dual operators turns their input into an -wise independent source.  That is, the set of vectors from the input vector space are mapped to an -wise independent source.  The proof of this fact below as the following Lemma and Corollary is useful in derandomizing the algorithm for a -approximation to MAXEkSAT.

Lemma

Then  is an -wise independent source.

Proof of lemma

It is sufficient to show that given any  matrix M, where k is greater than or equal to l, such that the rank of M is l, for all ,  takes every value in  the same number of times.

If we consider M written with respect to a basis where the first l rows are the identity matrix, then  has zeros wherever  has nonzero rows, and  has zeros wherever  has nonzero rows.

We can rewrite this as:

Fixing the value of the last  coordinates of
 (note that there are exactly 
such choices), we can rewrite this equation again as:

 for some b.

Since  has rank equal to l, there
is exactly one solution , so the total number of solutions is exactly , proving the lemma.

Corollary

Recall that BCH2,m,d is an  linear code.

Let  be BCH2,log n,ℓ+1.  Then  is an -wise independent source of size .

Proof of corollary

The dimension d of C is just .  So .

So the cardinality of  considered as a set is just
, proving the Corollary.

References 
Coding Theory notes at University at Buffalo

Coding Theory notes at MIT

Article proofs